Robin Hood: Prince of Thieves is a 1991 film about the legendary outlaw Robin Hood.

Prince of Thieves may also refer to:

 Robin Hood, sometimes known as the "Prince of Thieves"
 The Prince of Thieves, a 1948 film about Robin Hood
 Prince of Thieves, or Le Prince des Voleurs, an 1872 Robin Hood novel attributed to Alexandre Dumas
 Prince of Thieves, a 2004 novel written by Chuck Hogan

See also
 Princess of Thieves, a 2001 TV show starring Keira Knightley
 King of Thieves (disambiguation)
 Robin Hood: Prince of Thieves (disambiguation)